Al-Magar was an advanced prehistoric civilization of the Neolithic whose epicenter lay in modern-day southwestern Najd in Saudi Arabia. Al-Magar is possibly one of the first civilizations in the world where widespread domestication of animals occurred, particularly the horse, during the Neolithic period.

Overview 
The inhabitants of Al-Magar, who lived in stone houses built with dry masonry, were one of the first communities in the world to practice the art of agriculture and animal husbandry before climate changes in the region resulted in desertification.
 
Discoveries such as that of a large statue of a bridled horse indicates that the domestication of horses occurred about 9000 years ago in the Arabian peninsula, much earlier than in other parts of the world where domestication of the horse is thought to have occurred.
 Radiocarbon dating of several objects discovered at Al-Magar indicate an age of about 9,000 years.

In November 2017 hunting scenes showing images of what appears to be domesticated dogs resembling the Canaan dog and wearing leashes were discovered in Shuwaymis, an area about 370 km southwest of the city of Ḥaʼil. Dated at 8000 years before present, these are thought of as the earliest known depictions of dogs in the world.

References 

Neolithic cultures of Asia
Najd
Geography of Saudi Arabia
Historical regions in Saudi Arabia
World Heritage Sites in Saudi Arabia